The 1930 New York Yankees season was their 28th season. The team finished with a record of 86–68, finishing 16 games behind the Philadelphia Athletics. New York was managed by Bob Shawkey. The Yankees played their home games at Yankee Stadium. The Yankees set a team record by recording a .309 batting average during this season.

Regular season

Season standings

Record vs. opponents

Notable transactions 
 May 30, 1930: Waite Hoyt and Mark Koenig were traded by the Yankees to the Detroit Tigers for Harry Rice, Ownie Carroll and Yats Wuestling.

Roster

Player stats

Batting

Starters by position 
Note: Pos = Position; G = Games played; AB = At bats; H = Hits; Avg. = Batting average; HR = Home runs; RBI = Runs batted in

Other batters 
Note: G = Games played; AB = At bats; H = Hits; Avg. = Batting average; HR = Home runs; RBI = Runs batted in

Pitching

Starting pitchers 
Note: G = Games pitched; IP = Innings pitched; W = Wins; L = Losses; ERA = Earned run average; SO = Strikeouts

Other pitchers 
Note: G = Games pitched; IP = Innings pitched; W = Wins; L = Losses; ERA = Earned run average; SO = Strikeouts

Relief pitchers 
Note: G = Games pitched; W = Wins; L = Losses; SV = Saves; ERA = Earned run average; SO = Strikeouts

Farm system 

LEAGUE CHAMPIONS: Chambersburg

Notes

References 
1930 New York Yankees at Baseball Reference
1930 New York Yankees team page at www.baseball-almanac.com

New York Yankees seasons
New York Yankees
New York Yankees
1930s in the Bronx